Battle of Ulcinj was a battle between the Ottoman forces of Dervish Pasha and Albanian irregulars in the year of 1880 at the region of Kodra e Kuqe, close to Klleeznes. The area of Ulcinj had been handed over to Montenegro by the Ottomans after the Albanians previously fought against the annexations of Hoti and Grude. The Great powers instead pressured the Ottomans to hand over the area of Ulcinj, but also here the Albanians refused. Eventually the Great powers forced the Ottomans to take actions against the League of Prizren, ending the resistance and successfully handing over the town of Ulcinj to Montenegro.

Background 
Montenegro accepted the propositions made at the meeting of the Great powers in Istanbul, in 1880 in order to exchange the regions of Hoti and Grude with Ulcinj. Officially, the Porte did not resist the decision but explained that the Albanians would resist. The Ottomans had intention to delay cession of Ulcinj to Montenegro hoping to eventually avoid it, but Great powers were not ready to accept any delay and threatened to use force against the Ottomans. The Ottomans supported Prizren League as long as their interest corresponded with the interests of the League. According to some reports, the Ottomans actually armed Albanian irregulars with 3,000 rifles and 1,000 cases of ammunition in the coordinated actions of Shkoder vali Izet Pasha, commander of Ottoman forces in Tuzi Osman Pasha and Odo Beg Sokolović who was appointed as commander of the forces of Prizren League. Ulcinj had been the main port of Shkodra in order to get access to the Adriatic sea. The Albanians vehemently protested towards this, calling it injustice. The Great powers did however nothing to take into consideration the demands of the Albanians. The Ottomans, expecting trouble, sent their forces in Ulcinj to clear it from resistance. The Albanians, under the leaders of Isuf Sokoli, Haxhi Mehmet Beci and Mehmet Gjyli responded with an armed uprising. The Ottomans were unable to get to the Albanians as they had surrounded the city. The Great powers threatened with a naval demonstration if the Ottomans did not overrun the Albanians.

The Ottomans, frightened by the Great powers, sent Riza Pasha with 3000 soldiers to Shkodra to crush the League of Prizren. Riza Pasha warned that anyone who stood in the way would suffer the consequences. Riza Pasha proceeded to declare a total isolation of the city of Shkodra, banning all merchandise in order to starve the Albanians of Ulcinj. 2000 Albanians, commanded by Muftar Aga Reci positioned themselves in Kraje, at the mountains of Mozhura, in order to make the transportation of Riza Pashas forces as difficult as possible. The Great powers, hearing that Riza Pasha had failed to siege Ulcinj, sent their naval armadas outside the bay of Ulcinj, consisting of English, French, German, Russian, Italian and Austro-Hungarian along the coast of Dalmatia. This, however did not frighten the Albanians.

Pre-war 

Seventeen battalions of Ottoman forces, commanded under Riza Pasha, surrounded the city of Shkodër in order to capture Ulcinj. The Albanian forces, however, halted that march. The Albanian embassy in Shkodër declared the annexation of Ulcinj to be "unjustified". The great powers gave Riza Pasha three days to hand over the city to Montenegro. 6000 Ottoman soldiers occupied the city but were unable to pass through. British and Austrian forces came close to the coast of Ulcinj to try to compensate the Ottoman defeats.

The Ottomans appointed Dervish Pasha, previous vali of Salonika Vilayet, as new vali of Shkoder Vilayet. Istanbul sent him to capture the city; however, the Montenegrin forces under General Bozo Petrovic decided to try to occupy Ulcinj. The European naval forces made port outside the Bay of Kotorr but the Albanians were not frightened. Navy officers, such as Kapitan Sale, Lieutenant Caillard, Captain Gambler and Sir Arthur Evans, author of two books, described the situation. Ulcinj had been sieged by Montenegrin forces three years earlier during a twelve-month-long attack. During the offensive many Albanians were expelled. The Congress had no intentions of returning Ulcinj to the Albanians, and the Sultan watched did not bother with the requests and demands of the League of Prizren.

Dervish Pasha came by boat (Stamboul) to Ulcinj on 1 November 1880 together with 1,300 Ottoman infantry who came by other boat (Medjidie) but failed to disembark due to the resistance of the irregulars garrisoned in Ulcinj. Before his takeover of Ulcinj by land, Dervish Pasha disbanded the local committee of the Prizren League.

Resistance 

The Diber assembly began working for the Albanian demand of Ulcinj in the 1880s with 300 delegates. They gathered around five thousand irregulars from the Vilayet of Kosovo and from the Vilayet of Manastir. Together with Ali Pash of Gusinje, Illiaz Pash Dibra and Abdyl Frasheri they proposed for a vilayet within the Ottoman Empire. The Porte, however, refused to accept any other demands and the Sultan demanded the city to be handed over. The vote for the Albanian state to become a Vilayet within the Ottoman Empire received 120 votes. Other proposed that the Porte would decide what was to happen with Albania with support from the Congress of Berlin. The vilayet would be given an autonomy with its own borders. The delegates sent a message to the Sultan to approve of their request. Eventually, the Porte ordered General Riza Pasha to leave Shkodra and instead sent Dervish Pasha with 21 battalions. Dervish Pasha arrived in Shkoder on 4 November 1880. When he arrived with a ship he gave an ultimatum to the irregulars who refused to surrender Ulcinj. Thousands of irregulars continued to arrive at the city to defend it, with around 800 from Ulcinj, and another two thousand from Tuzi. Others came from Tetovo, Shkreli, Dibra, Kelmendi, Prizren and Gjakova. The ultimatum gave no result however. British and Hungarian consultants in Shkodër made an agreement with Dervish Pasha to try to persuade the Albanians to surrender the city. The consultants also recommended the sultan to give the Albanians autonomy in order to satisfy their demands.
The confusion amongst the Albanian leaders weakened them in their try to organize troops in the fight with the Ottoman forces. After three days, Dervish Pasha ordered his army to march in the city.

On 22 November 1880 Ottoman forces under command of Dervish Pasha crossed river Bojana near village Klezna and near Šas lake came to small unit of Albanian irregulars that blocked the road. The Ottomans first fired their guns into air, wounding by wandering bullets several irregulars, who fired back and the battle began. During the night Albanian irregulars received reinforcements of 500 men. According to works of Montenegrin king Nikola I Petrović, Albanian irregulars fled as soon as Ottomans entered Ulcinj district, with public statements claiming that they did not surrender Ulcinj without a battle.

The Albanians clashed with the Ottomans at the Kodra e Kuqe, near the village of Klesna. The Albanians defeated the first wave of Ottoman forces but when reinforcements arrived the Albanians were temporarily defeated and returned. The commander Isuf Sokoli was wounded and died later that day. In 1880, on 23 November, the Ottomans continued to march in the city and surrendered the city to the Montenegrin army. The city had officially been handed over to Montenegro and after a 30-month-long negotiation process, with European powers involved, the battle ended. 

Although Dervish Pasha tried to inspire the population of Ulcinj to emigrate from Ulcinj to the Ottoman Empire, nobody emigrated before Montenegrin army arrived because they already had experienced being Montenegrin citizens in January 1878 to February 1879. The population of Ulcinj came out on the streets to welcome Montenegrins taking control of the city advancing 500 meters after retreating Ottoman forces. On the following day voivode  Božo Petrović was greeted with acclamation of the whole population of the city. A delegation of notable citizens met with voivode Božo Petrović, who instructed them to organize elections for the City Assembly and court, which they did and elected the same people who held these positions in the first year of Montenegrin government over Ulcinj. A Montenegrin military unit of 200 Catholics from Bar was ordered to place the Montenegrin flag on the top of Ulcinj fortress.

Casualties 

The fight resulted in around 7800 casualties, with a majority of elderly, women and children who died and a territorial loss for the Albanians.

Aftermath 
The cession of Ulcinj to Montenegro caused additional animosity of Albanian population toward the Ottoman policy. After the border with Montenegro was agreed, all attention of Albanians was focused to the relations with Porte. The Ottomans interned notable Albanian leaders from Shkoder who objected to decisions of the Ottoman Government. In the Spring of 1881 the Ottoman forces under Dervish Pasha undertook a military campaign and crushed the Prizren League without much resistance.

Montenegrin newspapers mocked with lack of serious resistance of the League of Prizren, emphasizing that Ottoman Porte was behind the whole of these events, concluding that: "Today's surrender of Ulicnj proves that all that so-called Albanian resistance and that terrible Albanian League with which Turkey operated and deceived the whole world was actually nothing..." mocking with the texts in media sympathetic to position of League who wrote about "the tragic fall of Albanian lions although the uprising and surrender were actually only one ridiculous comedy."

See also
Battles for Plav and Gusinje

References

Sources

Further reading 
 
 

Ulcinj (1880)
Ulcinj
Rebellions in Montenegro
Albanian rebellions
Ulcinj
November 1880 events
Ulcinj